Dante Rivero is a Filipino film and television actor who has won a FAMAS award and nominated for a Gawad Urian Award.

Filmography

Film

Television

Awards and nominations
2008: 26th Luna Awards Best Supporting Actor: A Love Story

References

Living people
ABS-CBN personalities
Filipino male comedians
Filipino male film actors
GMA Network personalities
Year of birth missing (living people)
Kapampangan people